Joseph Edward Weber (February 15, 1862 – December 15, 1921), was a Canadian professional baseball player, who played in  with the Detroit Wolverines, of the National League. In his two-game career, Weber had no hits in 8 at-bats.

He was born and died in Hamilton, Ontario.

External links

1862 births
1921 deaths
19th-century baseball players
Baseball players from Hamilton, Ontario
Canadian expatriate baseball players in the United States
Major League Baseball outfielders
Major League Baseball players from Canada
Detroit Wolverines players
Omaha Omahogs players
Keokuk Hawkeyes players
Utica Braves players